Aldo Quaglio (Saverdun, 12 February 1932 – Lavelanet, 9 March 2017) was a French rugby union and rugby league player. He represented France at the 1960 Rugby League World Cup and played in 14 rugby league tests for France.

References

1932 births
2017 deaths
AS Carcassonne players
Dual-code rugby internationals
France international rugby union players
France national rugby league team players
French rugby league players
French rugby union players
RC Roanne XIII players
Rugby league props
Sportspeople from Ariège (department)
Rugby union props